Communauté d'agglomération Grand Auch Cœur de Gascogne is the communauté d'agglomération, an intercommunal structure, centred on the town of Auch. It is located in the Gers department, in the Occitania region, southwestern France. Created in 2017, its seat is in Auch. Its area is 602.0 km2. Its population was 38,899 in 2019, of which 22,173 in Auch proper.

Composition
The communauté d'agglomération consists of the following 34 communes:

Antras
Auch
Augnax
Auterive
Ayguetinte
Biran
Bonas
Castelnau-Barbarens
Castéra-Verduzan
Castillon-Massas
Castin
Crastes
Duran
Jegun
Lahitte
Lavardens
Leboulin
Mérens
Mirepoix
Montaut-les-Créneaux
Montégut
Nougaroulet
Ordan-Larroque
Pavie
Pessan
Peyrusse-Massas
Preignan
Puycasquier
Roquefort
Roquelaure
Sainte-Christie
Saint-Jean-Poutge
Saint-Lary
Tourrenquets

References

Auch
Auch